Breast cancer estrogen-induced apoptosis 2 is a protein that in humans is encoded by the BREA2 gene.

References